The Russian Federation uses a five-point academic grading system, where:

This system, with minor changes, has been in use in Russian schools since 1837. Between 1917 and 1935, the Communist government had tried to implement a radically new evaluation system with no grades at all, but it never fully took root.

Qualifiers + and – are often used to add some degree of differentiation between the grades, e.g. 4+ is better than 4 but not as good as 5–. Grading varies greatly from school to school, university to university and even teacher to teacher, and tends to be entirely subjective even for courses that lend themselves to objective marking such as mathematics and applied sciences. Even though the grades technically range from "1" to "5", "1" is not very common and is rarely given for academic reasons—in many cases a "1" is given as a result of failure to show up for an exam or to answer any questions. A "2" grade usually  means that the student showed little or no knowledge in a subject. 

In higher education, most subjects are graded ‘Pass/No pass’ ('Credit/No Credit') (зачёт/незачёт, pronounced "zachòt/nyezachòt"), and the rest are graded on the five-point scale. The 'Pass/No Pass' grades have no official numeric representation. When "zachòt"-type subjects are graded 'Pass/No pass' (sometimes translated as 'Credit/No credit'), this simply represents a student's good/poor knowledge of a subject. "Zachòt"-type subjects are also called "non-exams" due to lack of numerical representations. Each university applies its own standards of the level of knowledge required to pass each course. Students in Russia typically must pass all courses taken in order to graduate. 

The various possible interpretations of the notation "zachòt" (usually translated "credit" or "pass"), can create problems for Russian students applying to Western universities. Such notations, especially when people consider "zachòt"-type credit as a C, may confuse Western universities in their attempts at accurate conversion to a Western-system GPA.

References and external links

 Russian Ministry of Education and Science
 Russian education info

Russia
Education in Russia
Grading